Spilarctia cadioui is a moth in the family Erebidae. It was described by Thomas in 1989. It is found on Sulawesi in Indonesia.

References

Moths described in 1989
cadioui